John de Wit (b 1947) was Archdeacon of North West Europe from 2008 to 2012.

de Wit was educated at Oriel College, Oxford and Westcott House, Cambridge. After a curacy at Christ Church, Quinton he was Team Vicar of Solihull. He then served at Kings Heath, Hampton in Arden and Utrecht.

References

1947 births
Alumni of Oriel College, Oxford
Alumni of Westcott House, Cambridge
Archdeacons of North West Europe
Living people
20th-century English Anglican priests
21st-century Anglican priests